Anna Bacherini Piattoli (1720–1788) was an Italian painter.

Biography
Born in Florence, Piattoli studied with Francesco Ciaminghi, Francesco Conti, and Violante Beatrice Siries. She married the painter Gaetano Piattoli in 1741; the couple's son, Giuseppe, also became a painter, while another son, Scipione, achieved some note as a Piarist priest. Anna Piattoli specialized in miniature paintings and pastels, and produced portraits and religious scenes. An oil self-portrait of 1776, in which she is shown copying the Madonna del Sacco of Andrea del Sarto, is in the collection of the Uffizi.

References

1720 births
1788 deaths
Italian women painters
18th-century Italian painters
18th-century Italian women artists
Italian portrait painters
Portrait miniaturists
Pastel artists